Don't Be Foolish is a one-reeler 1922 silent film directed by and starring Billy West made by Sunrise Comedies and distributed by Superior Films.

West is less Chaplin-like in this role than former movies, limiting himself to a Chaplin moustache.

Plot
 
A man enters a park and sits on a bench, the titles tell us that the trees are full of sap and the sap is full of bananas. The man starts eating a banana.

A senior policeman in the park directs two junior policemen where to go. The man on the bench throws his banana skin on the ground and the policeman glares at him. When the policeman turns he throws a second skin, somewhat harder, hitting the senior officer in the chest. He thinks this is the second junior officer and tells him to stop getting fresh. When the junior officer leaves and he continues to get hit by more skins he goes to source the problem. He confronts the man, whio hands him a banana and walks off with the policeman following. A chase begins.

A second policeman joins as the man zigzags through the park. He poses with a statuary group to avoid being seen. He finds a man dressed similarly and tells him to run as there is a mad dog. The police run after the wrong man.

Outside the park a woman (Lydia) drops her handbag. He picks it up and taps her on the shoulder. When she turns her ugly face makes him faint.

Back in the park a pretty girl is feeding the ducks from a bench. Lydia goes into the park and sits on the other end of the bench to read a magazine. They chat and it is made clear that they live in the same apartment block. Lydia gives the younger girl a calling card.

The Toff bumps into a man as they meet on a corner. A nearby accident hurls the girl's small case which hits the man and he thinks it was the Toff (who is holding a stone). The man punches him to the ground. He looks inside the case and finds various make-up items all of which he eats. He particularly enjoys the powder puff. Walking with the little case two men ridicule him for looking effeminate. The girl catches up and asks for her case and he returns it. She gives him a calling card... but it is Lydia's.

The Toff does not realise that the girl has gone and he takes the policeman's arm and they go for a stroll. When they encounter a second policeman the Toff holds back, without seeing whose arm he has. He says "there is a certain cop I want to avoid". Eventually seeing him he runs off, again with various devices to stop being seen but is caught. The cop calls for the paddy wagon on a street phone but the Toff says he is hungry and wants to go to the nearby Sip and Bit Cafe. The policeman goes in to get him a sandwich. He takes the opportunity to use the phone to cancel the paddy wagon.

A different policeman arrives who saw  him using the police phone. He walks briskly off with the new policeman matching his stride. The tempo increases until they are running. He escapes and uses a phone to call Miss Lydia. Her maid answers and passes the phone to Lydia. The Toff calls her "sweet angel face" and asks if he can visit. When he arrives the maid answers the door. He sits on a sofa but when Lydia arrives he does not look and just repeatedly nudges her in a playful manner. When he eventually looks his hat flies off. He asks her to play hide and seek and blindfolds her. He climbs in the dumb waiter and it descends to the apartment of the girl he thought he was visiting. At first he does not see her and tries to creep out. She spots him and asks where he came from. He asks for a carnation from her vase.

Meanwhile, Lydia is still counting. She faints soon after reaching one million.

The toff spots a policeman's cap in the girl's flat and decides to leave - just as the policeman returns. He hides behind a screen but does not realise he is visible in a mirror to the side. They walk up and down in tandem and it turns into a dance and then a circular chase. He escapes via the fire escape and finds white overalls to dress as a decorator but the policeman spots the change. But when he gets closer and hits him it is a black man in white overalls. Another chase begins joined by a second policeman. He hides in a blanket striped with black paint which transforms his overalls into a typical prison uniform. He hides behind a fence but is rammed by  sheep and pushed through, where three policemen now wait. He runs into a tall gate and closes it, but it is the penitentiary.

Cast

Billy West as the Toff
Tom Murray as the Cop
Frank Hayes as Lydia Pinkham

References
 

Silent films
1922 films